This is a list of seasons played by Persepolis Football Club in Iranian and Asian football, from 1963 to the most recent completed season. It details the club's achievements in major competitions, and the top scorers for each season. Top scorers in bold were also the top scorers in the Iranian league that season.

Key
Key to league competitions:

 Iran Pro League (IPL) – Iran's top football league, established in 2001
 Azadegan League (Div 1) – The first tier of Iran football league until the inception of the Iran Pro League in 2001. It was downgraded to the second tier, but remained the highest division of the Iranian Football League until 2001, established in 1991
 Asian Club Championship Qualification (ACCQ)
 Tehran Football League (TFL)

 Local League (Loc) – The first period of Iran football league, established in 1970
 Takht Jamshid Cup (TJC) – The first tier of Iran football league from 1973 until Iranian Revolution in 1979
 Qods League (QL) – The first period of Iran football league after Iranian Revolution, held in 1989

Key to colours and symbols:

Key to league record:
 Season = The year and article of the season
P = Played
W = Games won
D = Games drawn
L = Games lost
F = Goals for
A = Goals against
Pts = Points
Pos = Final position

Key to cup record:
 NH = Not held
 WD = Withdrew
 DNE = Did not enter
 DSQ = Disqualified
 QGR = Qualifying Group Round
 GS = Group Stage
 R64 = Round of 64
 R16 = Round of 16
 QF = Quarter-finals
 SF = Semi-finals
 RU = Runners-up
 W = Winners

Seasons

Squads
This is selection of the most famous squads of Persepolis Football club from 1963 to the most recent completed season.

Famous Squads

Memorable matches
Persepolis F.C. vs Jam Abadan  1967
Persepolis was a weak team and played in 2nd Division at that time.
Although it was a friendly match, but it was the birth of a new pole in Iranian football.
4 of Shahin players played for Persepolis at that match :
Ebrahim Ashtiani, Nazem Ganjapour, Kazem Rahimi (as Captain) and Bahman Norouzi. After it rest of Shahin players joined Persepolis.

Persepolis F.C.  0-1   Paykan F.C.         December 22, 1970
Paykan used Persepolis’ previous season players except of Aziz Asli and Mahmoud Khordbin and Persepolis played with a young line-up because of contract between Abdo and Khayami. Ali Parvin scored Paykan's victorious goal!

Persepolis F.C.  6-0   Esteghlal             September 7, 1973
Persepolis’ the best ever result in Tehran derby.
Being beaten by 6 goals of their old Rivals and enemies  was so shameful for Esteghlal.
Homayoun Behzadi hattricked, Iraj Soleimani Scored twice and another goal scored by Hossein Kalani.

Persepolis F.C.  5-0  Homa F.C.           July 8, 1988
Homa was a respected team and was beaten by 5 goals.
Behrouz Soltani Goalkeeper of Persepolis played as a striker and scored a goal!

Persepolis F.C. 0 (4)-0 (2) Esteghlal     February, 1989
This is one of few times the two clubs have met each other in the Hazfi Cup. The match finished scoreless in regulation time, and extra-time was eventless. Persepolis beat Esteghlal 4–2 in penalty shootouts to advance to the next stage in the Hazfi Cup.

Persepolis F.C. 0-3 Esteghlal     January 11, 1995
In the 38th derby Persepolis was leading in the match by a score of 2-0 until the last 10 minutes of the match. Esteghlal scored 2 goals in quick succession, including one which was a penalty. This angered the Persepolis fans and players who felt the referee was biased towards Esteghlal. Persepolis fans stormed the field, and many fights broke out on the pitch between fans and players. After this match it was decided that Iranian referees will no longer be used for the derby.

Persepolis F.C. 2-2 Esteghlal     December 29, 2000
One of the most exciting and heated matches in derby history. The game was extremely sensitive as Mehdi Hasheminasab had left Persepolis in the off-season for Esteghlal. Behrouz Rahbarifar opened up the scoring in minute 56, while Mohammad Navazi tied the game up at the 67th minute. Many thought the game would be over when Hasheminasab scored a late goal at minute 86, but Ali Karimi saved Persepolis scoring a spectacular goal at minute 89 to please the red fans. During the game Esteghlal's goalkeeper Parviz Broumand and Persepolis striker Payan Rafat were constantly insulting each other. This eventually led to Broumand punching Rafat in the face and giving him a black eye. A massive fight broke out between the players. After the match hooligans went on a rampage. They completely destroyed 250 city buses and damaged many shops.  Three players from each side were arrested along with 60 fans for their behavior.
 
Persepolis F.C. 1-0 Fajr Sepasi  May 28, 2002
Persepolis' win against Fajr Sepasi on the last day of the 2001–02 league with Ebrahim Asadi's header just after he substituted gave them the title of first ever IPL champions.

Persepolis F.C. 1-2 Bayern Munich           January 2, 2006
It was the retirement match for Ahmadreza Abedzadeh. Ali Karimi was one of Bayern players and played against his former  club. Ali Ansarian scored for Persepolis .

Persepolis F.C. 2-1  Sepahan          May 17, 2008
Persepolis won Sepahan in front of over 100’000 fans and became 2007–08 IPL champion.
Mohsen Khalili lead Persepolis, After a while Ehsan Hajsafi tied game and it meant Sepahan is the champion. In 90+6th min when everyone was chill, in a chancy position, Captain Karim Bagheri Sent a Pass and Sepehr Heidari's Header lead Persepolis and gave them championship.
 Persepolis 3-2  Esteghlal         February 2, 2012 
After losing four times in a row, Persepolis and its fans were desperate for a win over their blue rivals. Head coach Mustafa Denizli had returned to the reds for the second half of the season and had previously experienced victory over Esteghlal back in 2006. Persepolis found themselves 2-0 down yet again and had Mehrdad Oladi very harshly sent off for what was seen as just a foul. Mazloumi and blues fans were beginning celebrations of yet another victory over their rivals as Persepolis fans began to leave the stadium when suddenly newly signed forward Eamon Zayed bagged a goal back for the reds in the 82nd minute. Persepolis were lifted by this goal and Zayed immediately connected with Mehdi Mahdavikia's excellent cross a minute later and levelled the score to 2–2 with a fine header. The last five minutes of the game was very open with Persepolis looking more lively and in the 92nd minute of the match, Hossein Badamaki's cross found Zayed yet again and the Libyan striker turned his defender and finished brilliantly to round off a historic hat-trick and great win for Persepolis and its fans.
 Persepolis 4-2 Esteghlal         April 15, 2016
This derby was highly anticipated and vital for both teams as they were competing for the top spot in the Iran Pro League table. Persepolis came into this match with an excellent form and were regarded as favourites to win; however, Esteghlal was in 2nd place above their archrival on goal difference. In a highly entertaining and end-to-end game, the red-clad Persepolis netted twice in each half to beat the blue-shirted Esteghlal 4–2 in their 82nd derby in Tehran on a rainy Friday and be the new Iran Pro League table-topper in the 26th week. The league's top scorer Mehdi Taremi (2), Ramin Rezaeian, Mohsen Mosalman scored for the reds; Jaber Ansari, Omid Ebrahimi (penalty) scored for the blues. After Red's captain Hadi Norouzi had died earlier in the season due to a heart attack in his sleep, Persepolis players and fans labelled the scoreline in reference to Norouzi's shirt number of 24.

See also 
 Persepolis F.C.
 Persepolis F.C. Honours
 Takht Jamshid Cup
 17th of Shahrivar league
 Azadegan League
 Iran Pro League
 AFC Champions League
 Asian Cup Winners' Cup

References

Seasons
 
Persepolis